Russia participated in the Junior Eurovision Song Contest 2006 in Bucharest, Romania. The Russian entry was selected through a national final, organised by Russian broadcaster All-Russia State Television and Radio Company (VGTRK). The final was held on 4 June 2006. Tolmachevy Twins and their song "Vesenniy Jazz" won the national final.

Before Junior Eurovision

National final 
On 5 April 2006, VGTRK announced that a national final would be held to select Russia' entry for the Junior Eurovision Song Contest 2006. A submission period for interested artists was opened and lasted until 27 April 2006. A professional jury selected twenty artists and songs from the applicants to proceed to the televised national final. The selected artists and songs competed at the national final which took place on 4 June 2006 in Moscow, hosted by Valeriya and Yuri Nikolaev. The winner was determined exclusively by public televoting. The members of the backup jury were Grigory Gladkov, Evgeny Krylatov, Alexander Zhurbin, Nadezhda Babkina and Philipp Kirkorov. In addition to the performances from the competitors, the show featured guest performances by Kseniya Sitnik, Vladislav Krutskikh and Volshebniki Dvora.

At Junior Eurovision 
During the allocation draw on 17 October 2006, Russia was drawn to perform last, 15th, following Croatia. Russia placed 1st, scoring 154 points and winning the contest.

Tolmachevy Sisters were joined on stage by four boys from the ballet troupe.

In Russia, show were broadcast on Russia-1 with commentary by Olga Shelest. The Russian spokesperson revealing the result of the Russian vote was Roman Kerimov.

Voting

Notes

References

Russia
2006
Junior Eurovision Song Contest